The F Book may refer to:

Internet
Thefacebook, now known simply as "Facebook"

Literature
The F-Word (book), a book first published in 1995